Alia Yassin Elkatib (born 1995) was an Egyptian individual rhythmic gymnast. She represented her nation at international competitions.

She competed at world championships, including at the 2011 World Rhythmic Gymnastics Championships.

References

External links
ELKATIB Alia
WORLD CUP LISBON 2014 PARTICIPANTS (UPDATED)

1995 births
Living people
Egyptian rhythmic gymnasts
Place of birth missing (living people)
Gymnasts at the 2010 Summer Youth Olympics